John J. Davis (March 19, 1909 – August 22, 1997) was a U.S. Army officer. In the 1960s Davis, then a major general, served as the assistant chief of staff for intelligence, headquarters, Department of the Army. He was later promoted to lieutenant general.

Davis is a member of the Military Intelligence Hall of Fame.
He retired from active duty in 1970 and died in 1997 of a stroke.

References

1909 births
1997 deaths
United States Army generals
United States Military Academy alumni
United States Army personnel of World War II
Recipients of the Distinguished Service Medal (US Army)
Recipients of the Legion of Merit
Burials at Arlington National Cemetery
People from Leavenworth, Kansas
Military personnel from Kansas